The 2005 IIHF World Women's Championships was held April 2–9, 2005, in Linköping, at Cloetta Center (now called the Saab Arena), and Norrköping, at Himmelstalundshallen, in Sweden. USA won their first gold medal at the World Championships, defeating the defending champions Canada in a penalty shootout. Sweden won their first medal at the World Women Championships, defeating Finland 5–2 in the bronze medal game. The championship was expanded to nine teams for 2006, so there was no relegation at any level.

Top Division

Preliminary round

Group A

Group B

Placement round

Bracket

5–8th place semifinals

Seventh place game

Fifth place game

Final round

Bracket

Semifinals

Bronze medal game

Final

Final standings

Awards and statistics

Scoring leaders
GP = Games played; G = Goals; A = Assists; Pts = Points; +/− = Plus-minus; PIM = Penalties In MinutesSource: IIHF.com

Goaltending leaders
(minimum 40% team's total ice time)

TOI = Time on ice (minutes:seconds); GA = Goals against; GAA = Goals against average; Sv% = Save percentage; SO = ShutoutsSource: IIHF.com
Canadian goaltender Charline Labonté is listed first in the IIHF source, however they incorrectly list her as playing 40% of the teams minutes, she played 37.5%.

Directorate Awards
Goaltender:  Chanda Gunn
Defenceman:  Angela Ruggiero
Forward:  Jayna Hefford

Media All-Stars
Goaltender:  Natalya Trunova
Defencemen:  Angela Ruggiero,  Cheryl Pounder
Forwards:  Krissy Wendell,  Hayley Wickenheiser,  Maria Rooth
MVP:  Krissy Wendell

Source:

Division I
The Division I IIHF World Women's Championships was held March 27 – April 2, 2005 in Romanshorn, Switzerland

 is promoted to the 2007 Women's World Ice Hockey Championships.

Statistics

Scoring leaders 
GP = Games played; G = Goals; A = Assists; Pts = Points; +/− = Plus-minus; PIM = Penalties In MinutesSource: IIHF.com

Goaltending leaders 
(minimum 40% team's total ice time)

TOI = Time on ice (minutes:seconds); GA = Goals against; GAA = Goals against average; Sv% = Save percentage; SO = ShutoutsSource: IIHF.com

Division II
The Division II IIHF World Women's Championships was held March 13–20, 2005 in Asiago, Italy

 is promoted to Division I for the 2007 Women's World Ice Hockey Championships

Statistics

Scoring leaders 
GP = Games played; G = Goals; A = Assists; Pts = Points; +/− = Plus-minus; PIM = Penalties In MinutesSource: IIHF.com

Goaltending leaders 
(minimum 40% team's total ice time)

TOI = Time on ice (minutes:seconds); GA = Goals against; GAA = Goals against average; Sv% = Save percentage; SO = ShutoutsSource: IIHF.com

Division III
The Division III IIHF World Women's Championships was held March 3–9, 2005 in Cape Town, South Africa

 was promoted to Division II for the 2007 Women's World Ice Hockey Championships

Statistics

Scoring leaders 
GP = Games played; G = Goals; A = Assists; Pts = Points; +/− = Plus-minus; PIM = Penalties In MinutesSource: IIHF.com

Goaltending leaders 
(minimum 40% team's total ice time)

TOI = Time on ice (minutes:seconds); GA = Goals against; GAA = Goals against average; Sv% = Save percentage; SO = ShutoutsSource: IIHF.com

Division IV
The Division IV IIHF Women World Championships was held April 1–4, 2005 in Dunedin, New Zealand.

 was promoted to Division III at the 2007 Women's World Ice Hockey Championships

Statistics

Scoring leaders 
GP = Games played; G = Goals; A = Assists; Pts = Points; +/− = Plus-minus; PIM = Penalties In MinutesSource: IIHF.com

Goaltending leaders 
(minimum 40% team's total ice time)

TOI = Time on ice (minutes:seconds); GA = Goals against; GAA = Goals against average; Sv% = Save percentage; SO = ShutoutsSource: IIHF.com

Citations

References
Complete results

IIHF results index for 2005

World
World
2005
IIHF Women's World Ice Hockey Championships
April 2005 sports events in Europe
Women's ice hockey competitions in Sweden
Sports competitions in Linköping
Sports competitions in Norrköping
2005 in Swedish women's sport